were a 1980s Japanese band. They are best known for their song "TOUGH BOY", used as the opening theme for Fist of the North Star 2.

Original members
TOM: Vocals and keyboard
Real name: 
Akio Hinago, Seiji Nagayoshi: Guitars
Fusahiko Ishikawa, Tadashi Hori: Bass
Kaoru Takagaki: Drums
Keisuke Kikuchi, Tsuru Suzuki: Keyboards

Current members
TOM: Vocals and keyboard
Keiji Sasaki: Guitar
Seiji Nagayoshi: Guitar
Hiroaki Naruke: Bass
Akira Ōtaka: Drums
Tsuru Suzuki: Keyboards

Discography

Singles
"Furare Kibun Rock'n'Roll" - November 14, 1984
"Summertime Graffiti" - April 5, 1985
"Umare Tsuite no CRAZY" - August 21, 1985
"Hitori Bocchino Hanrangun" - April 5, 1986
"LADY BLUE" - October 1986
"TOUGH BOY" c/w "LOVE SONG" - March 1987
Fist of the North Star 2 opening/ending theme single

Albums
TOMCAT - June 21, 1985
FENCE - May 1986
My Recommend: TOMCAT - December 21, 2006

External links
TOM's home page

Japanese rock music groups
Musical groups from Chiba Prefecture